The 4th Arunachal Pradesh Legislative Assembly election was held in 1990.  The Indian National Congress won the popular vote and a majority of seats and Gegong Apang was re-elected as Chief Minister of Arunachal Pradesh.

The election was held in 1,528 polling stations and on an average there were 334 electors per polling station.

Election Results 
NO. OF VALID VOTES : 349098

NO. OF VOTES REJECTED: 7,191 ( 2.02% of Total Votes Polled)

Elected Members

References

Arunachal Pradesh
State Assembly elections in Arunachal Pradesh
1990s in Arunachal Pradesh